Sergey Malitsky (Russian: Сергей Малицкий) is a Russian fantasy fiction writer of Polish descent. He is best known for his fantasy series Arban Saesh, The Code of Semideath, Nothing Personal and Ash of Gods. These are published by the Armada publishing house and by Eksmo.

Biography

In the year 2000 Malitsky released a collection of short stories entitled It's Easy («Легко»). Then he turned from short stories to novels. His debut in this form, the novel The Outlander's Mission («Миссия для чужеземца») was released in 2006. Sergey is a prizewinner of two prestigious in Russian-speaking world literature awards: Sword without a Name (Moscow, Russia, 2007, for the novel The Outlander's Mission) and Golden Caduceus (Kharkov, Ukraine, 2007, for the same novel). His short fiction have appeared widely in Russia and Ukraine.

Video game works
Malitsky has written the script of the fantasy video game Ash of Gods: Redemption for AurumDust.

Personal life

Sergey Malitsky currently resides in Russian city Kolomna. He is married and have two children.

Bibliography

Arban Saesh series

The Code of Semideath series

Nothing Personal series

Ash of Gods series

Stones of Mitutu series

Shelter of the Cursed series

Stand-alone novels

Novelettes

Short stories

References

Living people
Russian fantasy writers
1962 births
Russian people of Polish descent